Ceroplesis millingeni is a species of beetle in the family Cerambycidae. It was described by Pic in 1895. It is known from Saudi Arabia and Yemen.

References

millingeni
Beetles described in 1895